Glen Creason was the map librarian in the History & Genealogy department at the Los Angeles Central Library, a post he held from 1979 to 2021. He is also the author of Los Angeles in Maps and is a guest writer for many publications such as Los Angeles Magazine, additionally serving as a public speaker on the topics of maps, local history, and music. Creason is featured in Susan Orlean's chronicle of the Central Library, The Library Book. Since 2014, Creason has been the star of a Los Angeles Public Library series called Stories from the Map Cave. He retired in October of 2021.

Early life
Creason's family descended from immigrants from the British Isles who came to America in the 1760s. Growing up in South Gate, Creason attended Catholic school. As a kid, his father sent him to sell programs at the Coliseum for real-world job experience. Over time, Creason lived in many areas of L.A., including Silverlake, Long Beach, West Los Angeles, and Culver City.

Career
Creason worked at the Herald Examiner library for two years after college, then was offered a job at a library in San Dimas as a children's librarian. He started as a reference librarian at the Central Library in 1979.

Feathers map collection
Creason was the librarian called when an enormous map collection was discovered at a private residence in Los Angeles in 2012. It was absorbed into the library's collection, doubling its size. Creason is featured in the L.A. Review of Books documentary, Living History: The John Feathers Map Collection, about the collection's discovery.

Speaking engagements

Bibliography
Los Angeles in Maps (2010)
LAtitudes: An Angeleno's Atlas (2015)

External links
2015 Los Angeles Times profile of Creason, "Following L.A.'s history through maps," by David Ulin
2012 Los Angeles Times profile of Creason, "Los Angeles librarian is all over the maps," by Larry Harnisch

References

American librarians
Living people
Year of birth missing (living people)